An amenities ship is a ship outfitted with recreational facilities as part of a mobile naval base. Amenities ships included movie theaters and canteens staffed by mercantile crews of the Royal Fleet Auxiliary service. These ships were intended to provide a place where British Pacific Fleet personnel could relax between operations.

Background
As the Royal Navy prepared for operations in the Pacific Ocean during the final stage of World War II, it was recognized warships would be operating far from base facilities. Mobile naval base facilities were prepared for remote Pacific harbors without shore facilities. Each mobile base would include repair ships and depot ships to provide maintenance and personnel services for flotillas of small ships like destroyers, submarines, minesweepers, and landing craft. Base ships were outfitted with offices to provide administrative and communications services for efficient refueling and resupply of ships using the base, and accommodation ships provided living quarters for base staff and personnel awaiting transfer.

Description
Amenities ships were expected to provide an alternative to shore leave in remote locations without commercial recreation facilities. These 7,500-ton ships were former Blue Funnel Liners launched in 1929 and initially converted to auxiliary minelayers. They underwent further conversion at Vancouver in 1944 including installation of a brewery to make beer for shipboard consumption. These ships had been painted grey for service as North Atlantic minelayers, but were repainted white for service in the western Pacific. The war ended before they were used in their intended role as amenities ships.

References

Ship types